The Young Professionals (also known as TYP or T¥P) is an Israeli electro pop band made up of producer Johnny Goldstein (in Hebrew יונתן "ג'וני" גולדשטיין, born January 29, 1991) and singer/songwriter/producer Ivri Lider (in Hebrew עברי לידר, born February 10, 1974). The band mixes electronic sounds, guitars and acoustic percussion to create music described as alternative pop.

In 2012, the duo released their debut album internationally as 9am to 5pm, 5pm to Whenever (originally an Israeli 2011 release titled 09:00 to 17:00, 17:00 to Whenever). "TYP D.I.S.C.O.", a remake of the well-known hit by Ottawan is their first international hit single.

History

Origins
As solo artists, Ivri Lider is an established Israeli pop star who was named Israeli Artist of the Year in 2005. He has released six solo albums, all of which have gone gold or platinum, and composed music for the films Yossi & Jagger, Walk on Water and The Bubble. Johnny "Yonatan" Goldstein is a music producer who has worked with Hadag Nahash, Avishai Cohen and Dana Adini of Habanot Nechama.

In 2008, Goldstein asked Lider to contribute to his hip hop album The Johnny Show, but Lider was unavailable. A year later, the two met and began collaborating – Goldstein would send Lider an electronic track, and Lider would send back lyrics and melodies. The duo came up with The Young Professionals concept, recording music in the guise of fashionable yuppie characters who work during the day and spend their evenings dancing at clubs. To enhance the music’s playful commentary on modern life, they recruited fashion, design, art, video and social networking specialists to join the band.

Performances
TYP, accompanied by drummer Tal Tamari, has made a point of performing at events suited to their multi-disciplinary aesthetic. In 2011, they put on their debut performance at the Fresh Paint Contemporary Art Fair in Tel Aviv; created a video-mapping spectacle that correlated with the building’s architecture at the opening event for the Tel Aviv Museum of Art’s new Herta and Paul Amir Building; and played the Castro Fall 2011 Fashion Show. In 2012, they performed on the central stage at the 2012 Tel Aviv Gay Pride Parade, and on the French television show Le Grand Journal, broadcast live from the Cannes International Film Festival.

Debut album
TYP’s debut effort, 09:00 to 17:00, 17:00 to Whenever, was released in Israel in 2011. Each song on the album represents a different hour of the day, from working at the office during business hours to partying at the club at night. The record’s first single, “D.I.S.C.O.,” is a remake of Ottawan’s 1979 song of the same name. The video (directed by Guy Sagy) features an elaborate dance led by Israeli dancer Uriel Yekutiel, a frequent collaborator. The follow-up single, “20 Seconds,” was described as a “hypnotizing mashup of cool western electro and middle eastern heat.”

In January 2012, TYP signed a three-record deal with Polydor Records, a subsidiary of Universal Music Group, which intends to introduce TYP to a worldwide audience. 09:00 to 17:00, 17:00 to Whenever was released in France in June 2012 and North America in July 2012, with the amended title 9am to 5pm, 5pm to Whenever in line with the 12-hour clock. The 2012 release consists of a slightly different track listing from its precursor, including a cover version of Lana Del Rey's 2011 single "Video Games".

In March 2012, TYP signed with American events promoter Live Nation Entertainment.

Awards
At the 2011 MTV EMA Awards, TYP was named Best Israeli Act. The band was also nominated in the Worldwide category for Best European Act.

Discography

Albums

Extended plays
2012: EP 
2012: TYP Disco (The Remixes), Pt. 1 - EP 
2012:TYP Disco (The Remixes), Pt. 2 - EP
2014: Let's Do It Right (The Remixes), Pt. 1 - EP 
2014: Let's Do It Right (The Remixes), Pt. 2 - EP
2014: Think Again - EP

Singles
2011: "D.I.S.C.O." 
2011: "20 Seconds" 
2012: "Be With You Tonight"
2014: "Let's Do It Right" feat. Eva Simons
2015: "All Of It But Me" feat. Anna F.

Remixes

References

External links 
Official band site
TYP on Facebook
TYP on Twitter
TYP's Channel on YouTube
TYP on SoundCloud
TYP's POPs for Android phones

Israeli pop music groups
Musical groups from Tel Aviv
Israeli electronic music groups
MTV Europe Music Award winners